The Australia-China Council (ACC) is a long-standing institution in the Australia-China bilateral relationship. ACC was established by the Government of Australia in 1978 to promote mutual understanding and foster people-to-people relations between Australia and China. ACC combines the cross-sectoral bilateral expertise and advisory capacity of an independent Board appointed by the Minister for Foreign Affairs with the policy-making and management base in the Department of Foreign Affairs & Trade. By the time of the ACC's fortieth anniversary in 2018, it had "funded over 2,600 projects at a value of more than $23 million".

History
The concept of the Australia-China Council was borne out of discussions in 1975 between the first Australian Ambassador to China, Dr Stephen FitzGerald, and Jocelyn Chey who was a counsellor at the Australian Embassy in Beijing and later became the first head of the council's secretariat. On 11 May 1976, Dr Stephen FitzGerald wrote a letter to the then Foreign Affairs Minister, Andrew Peacock. He said:

This letter led to the establishment of the Australia-China Council in 1978 by the Orders-In-Council.

When FitzGerald returned to Australia, he convened a working group which presented a report to Peacock recommending the establishment of an advisory body which would make recommendations to the Minister for Foreign Affairs on the ways to develop and strengthen relations with China and which, under ministerial supervision, administers funding to support programs which will advance the bilateral relationship. The council would have an independent board representing, on a rotating basis, all major sectors and stakeholder groups involved in Australia-China relations. The board would be supported by a small secretariat in the Department of Foreign Affairs and Trade. The model has proved to be highly successful and effective and was later replicated with other bilateral foundations, councils and institutes in DFAT.  This structure has remained largely unchanged to this day. Initially, sixteen council members were appointed under the chairmanship of Professor Geoffrey Blainey, former chairman of the Australia Council.

Board members
The Australia-China Council Chair's commitment, guidance and leadership has been invaluable in developing, furthering and maintaining the successful bilateral relationship that Australia and China hold today.

Current board members
 Warwick Smith Chair - Chairman, Advisory Board Australian Capital Equity; Chairman, Senior Managing Director and Chairman for Australia & New Zealand Banking Group (NSW & ACT)
 Anne-Marie Schwirtlich - Director General of the National Library of Australia
 Margaret Jack - President of the China Advisory Board of Adecco Group
 Carolyn Kay - member of The Future Fund Board of Guardians, a non-executive director of Brambles, John Swire & Sons and Scentre Group and an external Board Member of Allens Linklaters
 Michael Wesley - Dean College of Asia at the Australian National University and the Pacific
 Dan Ryan - a commercial and technology lawyer
 Harold Weldon - is a writer, publisher, filmmaker and China advisor
 Ex-officio member - deputy secretary of the Department of Foreign Affairs and Trade responsible for North Asia; represents the department on the ACC Board

Former ACC chairs
 Mark Wainwright: 2006–2011
 John Yu: 2000–2006
 Stuart Simson: 1997–2000
 Stuart Harris: 1991–1996
 Hon. Gough Whitlam: 1986–1991
 Professor Wang Gungwu: 1983–1986
 Professor Geoffrey Blainey: 1978–1983

Strategic objectives
The council makes recommendations to the Government of Australia through the Minister for Foreign Affairs on strengthening the Australia-China relationship in ways that support Australia's foreign and trade policy interests.

The council's strategic objectives for 2014-18 are:

 To strengthen the foundations of engagement – China literacy, business and cultural capabilities of Australian institutions and people.
 To seek and foster new areas of engagement between Australia and China across business, knowledge and creative sectors.
 To enhance understanding in China of Australian society, economy, politics and culture through the Australian Studies in China Program.
  To showcase Australian creativity, entrepreneurship and innovation in China.
 To generate, disseminate and make accessible high‑quality, relevant and up-to-date information about Australia-China relations.
 To facilitate dialogue, develop professional and institutional networks between Australia and China and harness the leadership of Australian communities in strengthening bilateral connectivity.

Grants program
ACC helps to kick-start a wide range of innovative, high‑impact projects across China, Hong Kong, Taiwan, Macau and Australia that enhance Australia-China education, business and cultural connections. Its grant-making and program activities for 2014–2018 are centred on education, economic diplomacy, arts and culture and underpinned by the three cross-cutting themes: mobility, capabilities and new areas of engagement.

Funding priorities
Education: Support practical and effective solutions to enhance China literacy, business and cultural capabilities of Australian institutions and people to effectively engage with China, and promote education, science and innovation connectivity between Australia and China. 
 
Economic Diplomacy: Promote diversity, growth and innovation of Australia's trade and investment relationship with China.
 
Arts and Culture: Showcase Australian arts and creative industries to Chinese audiences and build closer and broader cultural and artistic partnerships.

Cross-cutting themes
 Mobility: Encouraging greater and more diverse professional mobility between Australia and China, including through support of the New Colombo Plan.
 
 Capabilities: Building capabilities of organisations and individuals to enter into partnerships and work effectively with their Chinese counterparts; and investing in resources (including new digital and mobile platforms) that inform Australian communities and relevant sectors about opportunities, practices and risks in engaging with China.
 
 New Areas of Engagement: Identifying and seeking practical solutions to develop new niche areas of engagement between the two countries.

Australian Studies in China Program
ACC has been supporting teaching and research on Australia in China for over two decades. ACC provides funding and information support to a network of over 30 Australian Studies Centres across China. The network is one of Australia's leading public diplomacy and education engagement platforms. The Australian Studies in China Program aims to build a vibrant, linked-up community of researchers, teachers and students participating in the study and research of Australian literature, economy, culture and other facets of Australian society. The Australian Studies Centres network is supported by the Australia-China Council, the Foundation for Australian Studies in China, the Australian Embassy and Consulates-General in China, and the broader Australian education and business community.

BHP Chair of Australian Studies at Peking University
The BHP Chair of Australian Studies is an initiative of the Australia-China Council, the Foundation for Australian Studies in China, BHP and Peking University. The establishment of the chair was announced by the Prime Minister in April 2011 during the official visit to China. It is the first high-profile, privately funded Australian professorial position in China, and is a reflection of strong and multifaceted education engagement between the two countries. The chair also provides academic leadership to a network of more than 30 Australian studies centres in Chinese universities, which has been supported by the Australia-China Council for two decades. Professor David Walker is the inaugural BHP Billiton Chair of Australian Studies at Peking University – he commenced in his role in 2013. In 2016 Professor Greg McCarthy (political scientist) became the new BHP Billiton Chair of Australian Studies at Peking University. Professor McCarthy also holds the Chair of Australian Politics at the University of Western Australia.

Foundation for Australian Studies in China
In 2011 ACC established the Foundation for Australian Studies in China– a unique partnership between government, business and higher education sector, created to boost support for the Australian Studies in China through the BHP Billiton Chair of Australian Studies, scholarships and strategic projects. BHP Billiton Chair of Australian Studies at Peking University is an initiative of the ACC, Foundation for Australian Studies in China, BHP Billiton and Peking University. It is the first high-profile, privately funded Australian professorial position in China - a reflection of extensive academic engagement between the two countries.

Policy and advocacy
The Australia-China Council provides informed advice to the Australian Government in relation to public diplomacy strategies and Australia-China economic, cultural and education engagement. ACC runs a robust outreach and advocacy program with the aim to promote diversity, depth and strength of the bilateral relationship among its vast network of partners, grantees, alumni, supporters and friends and broad Australian community. ACC is increasingly active online as a provider of high-quality, relevant and up-to-date information about the Australia-China relationship. ACC ‘Australia-China relations’ web-space is one of the most comprehensive Australian resources on the bilateral relationship.

Australia-China Council Delegations to China
The Australia-China Council Board undertakes regular official visits to China. The visits focus on engagement with the Australian Studies Centres network, Chinese government, think-tanks, business, arts, media and education stakeholders. This gives the board the opportunity to gain first-hand insights into the current political and socioeconomic developments in China.

Australia-China Council Chair's address to the Australia in China's Century Conference
On 30 May 2014 the Chair of the Australia-China Council, Warwick Smith, delivered a major address at the Australia in China's Century Conference in Melbourne. Mr Smith spoke about the role of the Australia-China Council in the bilateral relationship and importance of institutions of 'soft power' in Australia's engagement with China and the Indo-Pacific region.

Submission to the Australia in the Asian Century White Paper
The Australia-China Council Board has made a comprehensive submission to the Australia in the Asian Century White Paper outlining the board's views on directions of Australia's engagement with China.

References

External links
Australia-China Council website.
Department of Foreign Affairs and Trade website.
Foundation for Australian Studies in China website.

Australia–China relations
Organisations based in the Australian Capital Territory
Organizations established in 1978
1978 establishments in Australia